The Supreme Prosecutors Office is the highest prosecution authority in the Republic of China, commonly known as Taiwan.

Organizational structure
 Statistics Office
 Accounting Office
 Civil Service Ethics Office
 Personnel Office
 Information Management Office

Prosecutor General
The Prosecutor General of the Supreme Prosecutors Office is the highest ranking member of the prosecution system. The position is appointed by the president, and must be confirmed by the Legislative Yuan. The position carries a term limit of four years, and the appointee cannot serve consecutive terms. Notably, the prosecutor general has the exclusive authority to file extraordinary appeals.

List of prosecutor generals 
 Huang Shih-ming (- April 2014)
 Yen Da-ho (April 2014 - May 2018)
 Chiang Hui-min (May 2018 - May 2022)
 Xing Tai-Zhao (May 2022 -)

Transportation
The office is accessible within walking distance South of Ximen Station of the Taipei Metro.

See also 

 History of law in Taiwan
 Law of Taiwan
 Six Codes
 Constitution of the Republic of China
 Judicial Yuan
 Supreme Court of the Republic of China
 High Court (Taiwan)
 District Courts (Taiwan)
 Ministry of Justice (Taiwan)
 Taiwan High Prosecutors Office
 List of law schools in Taiwan
 Director of Public Prosecutions
Supreme People's Procuratorate

References

External links
 

1928 establishments in China
Government agencies established in 1928
Law enforcement agencies of Taiwan